Voltelin Albert William van der Bijl (31 January 1872 – 2 October 1941) was a South African cricketer who played for Western Province in the 1890s.

Voltelin van der Bijl was an all-rounder who batted in the middle order and opened the bowling. He took 6 for 56 and 3 for 36 in Western Province's victory over Griqualand West in 1890–91. In the 1892–93 season he made his highest first-class score of 61 and took three wickets when Western Province beat Transvaal in Western Province's first appearance in the Currie Cup. He was selected to tour England in South Africa's first overseas tour in 1894 but was unavailable and was replaced by Charles Mills.

His nephew Pieter van der Bijl and Pieter's son Vintcent played cricket for South Africa.

References

External links
 

1872 births
1941 deaths
South African cricketers
Western Province cricketers
Cricketers from Cape Town